Ernest George Maurice Lefebvre-Desvallières (3 October 1857 – 23 March 1926) was a 19th–20th-century French playwright.

Maurice was the brother of George Desvallières, son of Emile Lefebvre Desvallières and Marie Legouvé (daughter and granddaughter of academicians Ernest Legouvé and Gabriel-Marie Legouvé).

He studied at lycée Condorcet.

He wrote several theatre plays in collaboration with Georges Feydeau.

Works 
1879: Le premier bal 
1879: Amis d'enfance 
1881: On demande un ministre ! 
1884: Prête-moi ta femme !
1888: Les Fiancés de Loches 
1889: L'Affaire Édouard
1890: C'est une femme du monde ! 
1890: Le Mariage de Barillon, three-act comédie en vaudeville 
1894: Le Ruban 
1894: L'Hôtel du libre échange
1901: Le truc de Séraphin
1906: Le Fils à papa (adapted into Die keusche Susanne, 1910, and The Girl in the Taxi, 1912)
1920: Seine-Port et ses vieilles maisons 
1959: Champignol malgré lui

Filmography
Le Fils à papa, directed by Georges Monca and Charles Prince (France, 1913, short film, based on Le Fils à papa)
Champignol malgré lui (France, 1913, based on Champignol malgré lui)
The Girl in the Taxi, directed by Lloyd Ingraham (1921, based on Le Fils à papa)
Chaste Susanne, directed by Richard Eichberg (Germany, 1926, based on Le Fils à papa)
, directed by Fred Ellis (France, 1933, based on the play of the same name)
, directed by Marc Allégret (France, 1934, based on L'Hôtel du libre échange)
, directed by Maurice Cammage (France, 1936, based on Prête-moi ta femme)
, directed by André Berthomieu (France, 1937, based on Le Fils à papa)
The Girl in the Taxi, directed by André Berthomieu (UK, 1937, based on Le Fils à papa)
La Casta Susana, directed by Benito Perojo (Argentina, 1944, based on Le Fils à papa)
, directed by Luis César Amadori (Spain, 1963, based on Le Fils à papa)
Äktenskapsbrottaren, directed by Hasse Ekman (Sweden, 1964, based on L'Hôtel du libre échange)
Hotel Paradiso, directed by Peter Glenville (UK, 1966, based on L'Hôtel du libre échange)

References and sources

References

Sources

External links 
 Maurice Desvallières on data.bnf.fr
 Maurice Desvallières on Musée de Seine Port
 Maurice Desvallières on Art Lyrique
 

19th-century French dramatists and playwrights
20th-century French dramatists and playwrights
French male dramatists and playwrights
Lycée Condorcet alumni
1857 births
Writers from Paris
1926 deaths